Dear Bayo is a 2020 Nigerian romantic drama film written and directed by Imoh Umoren. The film stars Chimezie Imo and Tunbosun Aiyedehin in the lead roles while the film marked the fifth directorial venture of Imoh Umoren. The film was mostly shot in Niger Delta. The film was released on 31 January 2020 and opened to positive reviews.

Synopsis 
The storyline follows love affair between a youth corper Bayo who plays the titular role and Ebipade, a humble girl. Both are from humble backgrounds are smitten by each other but have to overcome obstacles in their personal lives to be together forever.

Cast 

 Chimezie Imo as Bayo
 Tunbosun Aiyedehin as Ebipade

Awards and nominations

References

External links 
 

2020 films
2020 romantic drama films
English-language Nigerian films
Films shot in Niger
Nigerian romantic drama films
2020s English-language films